José Guadalupe Cruz may refer to:

 José Guadalupe Cruz (writer) (1917–1989), Mexican writer
 José Guadalupe Cruz (footballer) (born 1967), football manager and former player

See also
José Cruz (disambiguation)